Ibrahim Ali is a paralympic athlete from Egypt competing mainly in category F57 javelin and discus events.

Ibrahim first competed in the Paralympics in 2000 where he won a silver in the discus and a bronze in the javelin.  He returned in 2004 where he improved to silver in the javelin but could not make the top three in the discus.

References

External links
 

Paralympic athletes of Egypt
Athletes (track and field) at the 2000 Summer Paralympics
Athletes (track and field) at the 2004 Summer Paralympics
Paralympic silver medalists for Egypt
Paralympic bronze medalists for Egypt
Living people
Medalists at the 2000 Summer Paralympics
Medalists at the 2004 Summer Paralympics
Year of birth missing (living people)
Paralympic medalists in athletics (track and field)
Egyptian male discus throwers
Egyptian male javelin throwers
Wheelchair discus throwers
Wheelchair javelin throwers
Paralympic discus throwers
Paralympic javelin throwers